In British folklore, British big cats, also referred to as ABCs (Alien, or Anomalous, Big Cats), phantom cats and mystery cats, feature in reported sightings of large felids feral in the British Isles. Many of these creatures have been described as "panthers", "pumas" or "black cats".

The existence of a population of "true big cats" in Britain, especially a breeding population, is rejected by many experts owing to a lack of convincing evidence for the presence of these animals. There have been some incidents of recovered individual animals, often medium-sized species such as the Eurasian lynx, but in one 1980 case a puma was captured alive in Scotland. These are generally believed to have been escaped or released exotic pets that had been held illegally, possibly released after the animals became too difficult to manage or after the introduction of the Dangerous Wild Animals Act 1976. Some sightings at a distance may be explicable as domestic cats seen near to a viewer being misinterpreted as larger animals seen farther away.

A fringe theory suggests that the animals may be survivors from the Ice Age, a time when leopards, scimitar-toothed cats, lions, and lynxes were found in the British Isles. While such animals are not known to have survived to the present, in his 2013 book Feral, George Monbiot argues that humans are programmed to notice things that might be big cats because of the threat they posed in prehistoric times.

Reported sightings

Documentation
The group Big Cats in Britain published reported sightings annually by county. The "top ten" counties or regions of Great Britain between April 2004 and July 2005 were:

First sightings
William Cobbett recalled in his Rural Rides how, as a boy in the 1760s, he had seen a cat "as big as a middle-sized Spaniel dog" climb into a hollow elm tree in the grounds of the ruined Waverley Abbey near Farnham in Surrey. Later, in New Brunswick, he saw a "lucifee" (North American lynx – Felis lynx canadensis) "and it seemed to me to be just such a cat as I had seen at Waverley." Another report appeared in the Daily Express on 14 January 1927 of a "lynx" being seen.

The New Forest folktale of the Stratford Lyon tells of how John de Stratford pulled a giant, red, antlered lion from the ground at South Baddesley in the New Forest in the year 1400. The story is first recorded in the marginalia of an 18th-century bible. In the late 20th century, sightings of the lion were recorded in the vicinity of the Red Lion Pub, Boldre.

Further back there is a medieval Welsh poem Pa Gwr in the Black Book of Carmarthen which mentions a Cath Palug, meaning "Palug's cat" or "clawing cat", which roamed Anglesey until slain by Cei. In the Welsh Triads, it was the offspring of the monstrous sow Henwen.

Evidence

Captures and remains

A Canadian lynx shot in Devon in 1903 is now in the collection of the Bristol Museum. Analysis of its teeth suggests that prior to its death it had spent a significant amount of time in captivity.

In 1980, a puma was captured in Inverness-shire, Scotland. The capture followed several years of sightings in the area of a big cat matching the description of the one captured, which had led local farmer Ted Noble to erect a cage trap. The puma was subsequently put into the Highland Wildlife Park zoo and given the name "Felicity". When it died it was stuffed and was placed in Inverness Museum.
Zoo director Eddie Orbell concluded that the animal had been tamed and might not have been released for long, noting that it enjoyed being tickled.

In 1988, a jungle cat was killed after being hit by a car on Hayling Island. The taxidermied remains ended up in the collection of Hampshire museum services. A year later, 1989, a jungle cat that had been hit by a car was found on the roadside in Shropshire.

In 1991, a Eurasian lynx was shot near Norwich, Norfolk. It had killed around 15 sheep within two weeks. The story was only reported in 2003, and the stuffed body of the lynx is allegedly now in the possession of a collector. For many years this incident was considered to have been a hoax, particularly by the hunting community, but in March 2006 a police report confirmed that the case was true. It was probably an escapee from a facility in the area that bred animals, including Eurasian lynxes.

In 1994, it was reported that a large cat with leopard-pattern fur had been shot on the Isle of Wight some time earlier after feasting on chickens and ducks. The shooting was not immediately reported as the farm worker involved feared prosecution, but police reportedly concluded that the animal was an ocelot or serval.

There have been reports that in 1993, yet another puma was captured in Scotland, this time in the Aviemore area.

In 1996, police in Fintona, County Tyrone, Northern Ireland shot a cat. It was reportedly a caracal, a medium-sized wildcat species found in Africa and Asia, although a police report described it as a lynx.
(Caracals are sometimes called desert lynxes, but are not true members of the genus Lynx.)

In a well-reported 2001 case ("the Beast of Barnet"), a young female Eurasian lynx was captured alive by police and vets in Cricklewood, north-London, after a chase across school playing fields and into a block of flats. It was placed in London Zoo and given the name "Lara" before ultimately being transferred to a zoo in France to breed.
The captured lynx was found to be only 18 months old, although considerably larger than an average domestic cat.

In November 2017, a trucker claimed to have seen three highways workers struggling to lift the body of a dead  black panther into the back of a truck in a lay-by on the A1 near Harworth.
However, Highways England responded with a statement to say that it was a dead black dog that they had loaded onto the back of the truck.

Video and photographic evidence

Around 1993, a number of reports were made of a large black cat around Bodmin Moor, nicknamed the "Beast of Bodmin", with at least two videos made.

Twenty-one years after this a colour video at Winkworth Arboretum (NT), Busbridge next to Godalming was taken of a large cat walking away beneath a branch. A Surrey Wildlife Trust published they doubted any "puma" form as the recorder thought, but rather thought it could be an Iberian lynx, comparing other reports made that year in Surrey's Borough of Guildford. Less well noted similar accounts have been sporadically reported since 1959, but have tended to be vague or anonymous.

In 1994 footage of a large black cat was recorded in Cambridgeshire and was named in the media as the "fen tiger".

In June 2006 a large black cat was recorded in the countryside of Banff, Aberdeenshire. Footage of the cat was broadcast by the BBC on 24 May 2007.

In July 2009, photographs and video footage of a large black cat were taken by an off-duty Ministry of Defence Police officer. The animal was walking along a railway line in Helensburgh, Argyll. Large cats, either black or tan, have been reported in the area before.

In late 2009 video footage of what is claimed to be a large black cat was recorded in Herefordshire.
The sighting and video footage of the alleged big cat coincided with a spree of sheep killings in the same area.

In 2010 video footage of what is claimed to be a large black cat was recorded in Stroud, Gloucestershire.
'Experts' have estimated that the creature was at least  in length from nose to tail.

In 2011 a family walking in Fochabers Wood, Moray, photographed a large black cat matching the description of a forest jaguar.
In the summer of the same year, a black panther known as the "Beast of Dartmoor" was reportedly seen by a group of fifteen people, including Matthew P. Warburton, in the Haldon Forest, Devon.

In 2013, photos were taken of what appeared to be a large black cat on the estate of Sir Benjamin Slade, 7th Baronet in Somerset.

In 2017 there were five sightings of big cats in Gloucestershire, some with photographic evidence.

In April 2017 a mother and her teenage daughter took several photos of what appears to have been a large black big cat in the Quantock Hills, Somerset, which was speculated by BeastWatch UK, a non-profit organisation that collates and reports on exotic wildlife, that it could have been a panther or jaguar.

A 2017 documentary included footage taken by an off-duty police officer in the West Midlands of a large black cat that was analysed by a big cat expert from South Africa who concluded that it had the characteristics of a black leopard.
He also analysed footage taken of a large black cat in the village of Maiden Newton, Dorset and said that it was the "most conclusive evidence so far that a black leopard is on the loose in the UK".

2020 saw the public locked down by Covid restrictions for large portions of the year. With people confined to their homes and restricted to local walks for recreation, this year saw a large numbers of sightings across the country. 
In Cambridgeshire a large leopard like cat was photographed drawing comparisons with the legendary "fen tiger".
Gloucestershire had numerous sightings. 
North Wales, a known hotspot for big cats, where "It seems it's common knowledge among many local communities that a small population of big cats such as pumas exist within North Wales." had its share although it was only caught on camera once.
In Somerset an animal fitting the description of a melanistic leopard was seen by a number of witnesses in various places. "One person believes she has footage of a big cat and has approached a big cat expert to review her evidence." 
In Leicestershire an animal was caught on camera.
A serval-like cat was photographed in North London.

In 2021 in large dark coloured cat was filmed in Flintshire.

Attacks

In 2000 an 11-year-old boy in Monmouthshire was attacked by what he claims was a large black cat. It left him with five long claw marks across his left cheek. The police called in a big cat expert to investigate the incident.

In 2005 a man who lived in Sydenham Park in south-east London was attacked in his back garden, which backed onto a railway line. He was left with scratches all over his body. Police were called and according to the BBC, one police officer saw a cat the size of a Labrador dog.
The man who was attacked sustained scratches to his face and the alleged big cat was named locally as the "Beast of Sydenham".

In 2008, it was reported that a 74 year old woman was attacked on two separate occasions by a large cat in Alness, Scottish Highlands, leaving her with injuries, but a Scottish wildcat expert concluded that it was most likely a large feral domestic cat living wild, possibly a hybrid with a Scottish wildcat, but ruled out that a Scottish wildcat itself was responsible for the attacks.

In 2019 a man in Cornwall reported that a  black cat attacked him through an open window and that it was trying to get in through the window.
He described it as being crossed between a domestic cat and a panther. He was said to have reported it to the police and claimed "that they were not interested".

DNA evidence

There have been conflicting reports of DNA evidence as to the existence of big cats in Britain: In 2011 it was announced by the Centre for Fortean Zoology that DNA testing, carried out by Durham University on hairs found in north-Devon, showed that a leopard was living in the area.
In 2012 it was announced that DNA testing on two deer carcasses found in Gloucestershire found only fox DNA, despite many locals reporting sightings and believing that the deer had been killed by a big cat.

The Cotswolds big cat
The "Cotswolds big cat" was a purported big cat or number of big cats at large in the Cotswolds region of England.

A walker in Woodchester Park found the carcass of a roe deer on 12 January 2012, with injuries suggesting the animal may have been mauled by a large felid. A second similar deer carcass was found on 16 January 2012.

An analysis of the deer carcasses by University of Warwick scientists only indicated DNA evidence of foxes and other deer.

Government involvement
In 1988, the Ministry of Agriculture took the unusual step of sending in Royal Marines to carry out a massive search for the rumoured Beast of Exmoor after an increase in the number of mysteriously killed livestock, and farmer complaints over subsequent loss of money. Several Marines claimed to have seen the cat fleetingly, but nothing other than a fox was ever found. The Department for Environment, Food and Rural Affairs has published a list of predatory cats that they know to have escaped in the United Kingdom, although most of these have been recaptured.

In popular culture and film

In 1967 children's novelist Monica Edwards took the story on in her Punch Bowl Farm series, as The Wild One.

A fictional attempt to trap the Beast is the subject of the film Young Hunters: The Beast of Bevendean (2015).

The stories of British big cats have inspired a number of drinks including Exmoor Beast, a strong dark porter brewed by Exmoor Ales, Beast of Bodmin a red ale made by the Firebrand Brewing Company and the Dartmoor Distillery’s Dartmoor Beast Gin.

Colin Dann used the "British big cats as survivors of the prehistoric past" version of the belie to furnish his 1985 novel The Siege of White Deer Park with an antagonist. In this, the fifth novel of The Animals of Farthing Wood series, White Deer Park is terrorized by a massive cat large enough to bring down the titular deer. When Tawny Owl manages to converse briefly with the cat, which the park's residents dub "The Beast", it is described as having golden-brown fur with dark splotches that help it to blend into the shadows, and it proudly boasts that it is of an ancient lineage that has roamed the woods of Britain far longer than humanity, without ever having been detected. It ultimately quits the park to pursue a female cat in heat.

Mythological explanation
For many hundreds of years the myth of the spectral Black Dog has persisted in Britain – a supposed mythical creature appearing as a large black animal in remote moorland with no firm evidence for its existence, beyond hearsay. It has been suggested that the stories of "Black Cats" are merely a modern continuation of such myths and stories, sharing the same elements but with the idea of a supernatural cause having fallen out of credibility and the modern, more plausible, idea of an escaped or released wildcat supplanting it. In addition, the stories of big cats share many traits suitable for the tabloid press – as such leading to wide exposure of any potential "cat" and further and rapid dissemination of any speculation or supposed evidence for it, helping to build a widespread urban legend.

See also
 Beast of Bodmin Moor
 Beast of Exmoor
 Cryptozoology
 European wildcat
 Kellas cat, a natural landrace of hybrid cats descended from crossbreeding between domestic cats and Scottish wildcats
 The Siege of White Deer Park – children's novel by Colin Dann featuring a big cat hiding in an English wood

Footnotes

References 
 

Animals in the United Kingdom
British legendary creatures
Cat folklore
Mythological felines
Monsters